The Sutherland Brothers (Gavin and Iain Sutherland) were a Scottish folk and soft rock duo. From 1973 to 1978, they performed with rock band Quiver, and recorded and toured as Sutherland Brothers & Quiver. Under this combined moniker, the group recorded several albums and had a significant international hit single with the song "Arms of Mary" in 1976. In North America, they are primarily known for their 1973 single "(I Don't Want to Love You But) You Got Me Anyway".

Iain died of an illness on 25 November 2019, aged 71.

Personal details
 Gavin Sutherland (born 6 October 1951 in Peterhead, Aberdeenshire, Scotland) – bassist and vocalist.
 Iain George Sutherland (born 17 November 1948 in Ellon, Aberdeenshire, Scotland, died 25 November 2019, Wollerton, Shropshire, England) – vocalist, guitarist and keyboards.

Career
The Sutherland Brothers began their career in 1968 as A New Generation, having some success with the single "Smokie Blues Away" (which used a melody based on the second movement of Dvořák's New World Symphony), backed with "She's a Soldier Boy" on Spark. Subsequently with the Sutherland Brothers Band (featuring bassist Kim Ludman and drummer Neil Hopwood), they won a new recording contract with Island Records and put out an album in 1972. Their first single as the Sutherland Brothers Band was under this contract and was a minor hit, "The Pie", in January 1972. Their follow-up single was "Sailing", which had much radio play but was commercially unsuccessful (it was later covered by Rod Stewart).

Their second album Lifeboat was billed simply as Sutherland Brothers, and was recorded with different backing musicians. They released another two singles in 1972 (one as the Sutherland Brothers Band, one as Sutherland Brothers), then in early 1973, in an effort to diversify and expand their folk-based sound, the Sutherland Brothers joined forces with a local rock band known as Quiver. Quiver was originally formed by guitarist Tim Renwick and bassist John 'Honk' Lodge (both formerly with Junior's Eyes and David Bowie), but soon comprised Tim Renwick, guitarist and singer Cal Batchelor, bassist Bruce Thomas and drummer Willie Wilson. Most of the members of Quiver are also featured on Al Stewart's albums Orange (1972) and Past, Present and Future (1973).

The Sutherland Brothers and Quiver (1973–78)
The Sutherland Brothers' greatest success came through their collaboration with Quiver, whereby releases were credited to the "Sutherland Brothers and Quiver". The amalgamated group's first single, 1973's "(I Don't Want to Love You But) You Got Me Anyway", was a minor success in North America, reaching number 48 on the Billboard Hot 100 in the US, N. 20 on the Cashbox pop charts and peaking at number 25 in Canada. After the release of this single, and after only a few gigs with the band, Batchelor (who had been Quiver's primary songwriter) left. After a few more shows as a five-piece, Batchelor was replaced by keyboardist Peter Wood. The six-piece group then recorded three other tracks that were included in a heavily-revised North American issue of Lifeboat. In the US and Canada, Lifeboat was credited to the Sutherland Brothers and Quiver, although Quiver did not play on the majority of the album's tracks.

The Sutherland Brothers and Quiver's proper full-length debut was 1973's Dream Kid. Bruce Thomas, who had repeatedly been clashing with Iain Sutherland, then was asked to leave the group during a tour of Europe in March 1974. With only a week to go before the band was due to record their next album, Tex Comer filled in on bass for live gigs and a few album cuts, but Gavin Sutherland quickly moved over from guitar to bass, and the band continued as a five-piece.

After their 1974 album Beat of the Street supplied no chart singles, Wood then left the group, and the remaining members left Island Records for CBS.

As the band was switching labels, a cover of one of the earlier Sutherland Brothers recordings, "Sailing", became a major UK hit for Rod Stewart.

The September 1975 album release Reach for the Sky marked the debut of the Sutherland Brothers and Quiver on CBS Records. Their first CBS single, "Ain't Too Proud" (1975; featuring David Gilmour of Pink Floyd on pedal steel guitar) did not chart, but the second CBS single, "Arms of Mary" charted in April 1976, becoming a UK top ten hit single. "Arms of Mary" was also an international success most notably in Ireland and the Netherlands – in which territories the track was number 1 for respectively four and three weeks – with the track also reaching number 1 on Belgium's Flemish charts. The track "When the Train Comes" was also released as a single.

The Sutherland Brothers and Quiver achieved one further UK chart success, "Secrets", in November 1976, from their next album Slipstream. Guitarist Renwick left the group in 1977 and was not replaced; guitarist Robert Wood from the Murky Joe Band was scheduled to join the band on tour but family ties prevented it, this left drummer Willie Wilson as the only remaining member of Quiver. The Sutherland Brothers and Quiver recorded one final album in 1977, Down To Earth with a wide array of guest musicians helping out, including Renwick, Andy Pyle from the Kinks, Rick Wills of the Small Faces, Brian Bennett from the Shadows and ex-Moon drummer John Shearer on percussion. It failed to chart, nor spin off any hit singles.

Back to being a duo (1979)
The Sutherland Brothers parted company with Quiver (i.e., Wilson) by 1979, but continued to release material as the Sutherland Brothers for a time. In this period, they achieved one further chart success with "Easy Come Easy Go", in June 1979. However, they disbanded late in 1979 after recording a final album When the Night Comes Down on CBS, with the final single being "First Love" / "Crazy Town".

Post-Quiver
 Quiver's Tim Renwick went on to play lead guitar with Al Stewart, and a later incarnation of Pink Floyd.
 Bassist Bruce Thomas likewise recorded with Al Stewart in 1972 to 73, and subsequently joined Elvis Costello and the Attractions.
 Peter Wood (aka Peter Woods) contributed keyboards to Al Stewart's albums from 1972 to 78, later worked with Cyndi Lauper, and also worked with Pink Floyd during their 1980 and 1981 shows for The Wall. Born Peter John Wood, 9 April 1950 in Middlesex, England, he died in December 1993 in New York City.
 Drummer Willie Wilson (born 8 July 1947, Cambridge, Cambridgeshire) recorded with Al Stewart in 1972 to 73, and also worked with Pink Floyd during the period (1980–81) when the band were touring with The Wall, and played drums on David Gilmour's first solo album.

Discography

Quiver albums
Quiver (1971)
Gone in the Morning (1972)

The Sutherland Brothers Band album
The Sutherland Bros' Band (1972) - AUS #35

The Sutherland Brothers album
Lifeboat (1972) - AUS #37

Sutherland Brothers and Quiver albums

Sutherland Brothers album
When the Night Comes Down (1979)

Sutherland Brothers and Quiver compilation albums
Sailing (Island, 1976) 
The Very Best of the Sutherland Brothers and Quiver (2002)

Gavin Sutherland solo albums
Diamonds and Gold (1999)
The Deal (2008)
Tango at the Lost Cafe (2013)

Singles

Notes

References

External links
 [ The Sutherland Brothers biography at AllMusic]
 
  - Gavin Sutherland
  - Iain Sutherland
  - Quiver
 Brief anecdotal history of SBQ at Any Given Tuesday
 Detailed fan site
 Tim Renwick bio with details of Quiver and SBQ line-up changes etc.

Scottish musical duos
British soft rock music groups
Scottish folk rock groups
Folk rock duos
Soft rock duos
Sibling musical duos
People from Aberdeenshire
CBS Records artists
Island Records artists
Male musical duos